The following is a list of people from Paraguay.



B
Cecilio Báez, politician and writer
Agustín Barboza, singer and composer
Agustín Barrios-Mangoré, guitarist and composer
Edgar Baumann, track and field athlete
Yohana Benítez, beauty queen and model
Emilio Bigi, musician
Luis Bordón, harp player 
José Bozzano, military engineer who led the Paraguayan war effort during the Chaco War designed gunboats for the Chaco War
Karina Buttner, beauty queen and model

C
Victor Caballero, former tennis player
Gabriel Casaccia, writer
José Cardozo, former professional footballer
Leonor Cecotto, artist
Feliciano Centurión, painter
José Luis Chilavert, former professional footballer
Julio Correa, playwright
Raúl Cubas Grau, politician and former president

D
Rogelio Delgado, former professional footballer
Nicanor Duarte Frutos, former President of Paraguay

E
Egni Eckert, beauty queen and model 
Arsenio Erico, soccer player
Víctor Espínola, harp player

F
Buenaventura Ferreira, former professional footballer
Diego Ferreira, track and field athlete
Nadia Ferreira beauty queen and top model
Diego Martínez Ferreira, professional footballer
Renée Ferrer de Arréllaga, writer
José Asunción Flores, director and composer
Carlos Franco, professional golfer
Julio César Franco, politician and former vice-president
Leryn Franco, track and field athlete
 Carlos Filizzola, politician and major of Asunción

G
Carlos Gamarra, former professional footballer
Herminio Giménez, composer
Sila Godoy, guitarist and composer
Juan Natalicio González, former president and writer
Yanina González, beauty queen and model
Guadalupe González beauty queen and model
Luis González Macchi, politician and former president
Julieta Granada, golfer
Cesar Grillon, former Paraguayan ambassador to Indonesia

J
Ramón Jiménez Gaona, track and field athlete
Juliana, 16th-century Guaraní rebel

K
Nery Kennedy, track and field athlete

L
Nicolás Léoz, CONMEBOL president
Carlos Antonio López, politician and former president
Francisco Solano López, politician and former president
Aníbal Lovera, composer and singer
Lourdes Arévalos beauty queen and model

M
María Maldonado, beauty queen, model and singer
Fiorella Migliore beauty queen, model and actress
Ricardo Migliorisi, painter, costume designer, scenery designer and architect

N
Jorge Daniel Núñez (born 1984), professional football player
Jorge Martín Núñez (born 1978), professional football player

O
Christian Ovelar, professional footballer
Lino Oviedo, general and coup leader

P
Víctor Pecci, tennis player
Silvio Pettirossi, aviator
Josefina Pla, poet and artist

Q
Andrea Quattrocchi, actress and ballerina

R
Gabriela Rejala, beauty queen and model
Alba Riquelme, beauty queen and model.
Blas Riquelme, politician, businessman and landowner
Larissa Riquelme, model and actress, named "Girl of the FIFA 2010 World Cup"
Augusto Roa Bastos, writer, novelist
Andrés Rodríguez, army general and former president
Guido Rodríguez Alcalá, writer
Hugo Rodríguez-Alcalá, writer
José Gaspar Rodríguez de Francia, first Paraguayan head of government
Yren Rotela (born 1981), activist for rights of LGBT people and sex workers

S
Roque Santa Cruz, professional footballer
Oscar Vicente Scavone, businessman
Clara Sosa beauty queen and model, winner of Miss Grand International 2018
Alfredo Stroessner, dictator of Paraguay

T
Tsiweyenki (Gloria Elizeche), leader of indigenous Maká people

V
Pablo Medina Velázquez, journalist

W
Juan Carlos Wasmosy, president of Paraguay

Z
Pablo Zeballos, professional footballer

See also
List of people by nationality
List of presidents of Paraguay
Hispanics